Felisha Nayomie Johnson (born July 24, 1989) is an American track and field athlete who specialises in the shot put. She was the 2015 national indoor champion in the weight throw. She won two NCAA collegiate titles in that event for the Indiana State Sycamores.

Early life and college
Born in Indianapolis, Indiana to Ronald and Loesker Johnson, she attended Lawrence North High School and joined the school's track and field team. Johnson broke the school record for the shot put and the discus and was a high school state champion. She gained a scholarship to study sports management at Indiana State University. She redshirted her first academic year and only began competing athletically for the Indiana State Sycamores from 2010 onwards.

In her first year for the Sycamores she was a Missouri Valley Conference (MVC) finalist but did not reach the NCAA level. She competed at the NCAA Outdoor Championships that season in both shot put and hammer throw. She did not achieve the same success in 2012: she was third at the MVC Indoor Championships in both shot and weight throw, then did not defend her NCAA title, coming fourth in the weight throw. Outdoors she took third places in shot put and discus throw at the MVC Championships and was fifth in the shot and 22nd in discus at the NCAA Outdoors. She competed at the 2012 United States Olympic Trials and though she did not make the final, she came 13th overall in shot put.

Johnson's final year at Indiana State was her most successful. She won the weight throw at the NCAA Indoor Championships for a second time with a new best of  – this moved her up to tenth on the all-time lists. Johnson's title win came ten years after her coach, Erin Gilreath, had won the same title. She was also eighth in shot put at the NCAA Indoor Championships and came fourth in the weight throw at the 2013 USA Indoor Track and Field Championships, her best senior national placing at that point. She also won her first MVC Indoor title in the weight throw and was the shot put runner-up. At the MVC Outdoors she won both shot put and discus events, as well as taking fourth in the hammer. In her final collegiate nationals, she was third in shot put and 23rd in the hammer at the 2013 NCAA Outdoor Championships. Her last appearances as a college athlete came at the 2013 Summer Universiade, where on her international debut for the United States she placed seventh in the shot put.

Professional
Leaving college, she began competing in the shot put as a professional athlete. At the 2013 USA Outdoor Track and Field Championships she placed fifth. In the 2014 season she signed a contract with Nike, Inc. and  placed herself among the world's top shot putters. She placed seventh on the global lists that year, and was the second best American behind Carter.

She dropped down the order at the USA Outdoor Championships, however, managing only sixth and failing to make the national selection.

She returned to top form in the 2016 season. In the outdoor season she threw a shot put best of  then came close to that mark to place third at the 2016 United States Olympic Trials, earning her first place on an American Olympic team.

Personal records
Shot put –  (2016)
Indoor –  (2016)
Discus throw –  (2012
Hammer throw –  (2011)
Weight throw –  (2016)

All information from All Athletics

International competitions

National titles
USA Indoor Track and Field Championships
Weight throw: 2015
NCAA Women's Division I Indoor Track and Field Championships
Weight throw: 2011, 2013

References

External links
 
 
 
 

1989 births
Living people
American female shot putters
African-American female track and field athletes
Indiana State Sycamores women's track and field athletes
Athletes (track and field) at the 2016 Summer Olympics
Olympic track and field athletes of the United States
Female weight throwers
Track and field athletes from Indianapolis
USA Indoor Track and Field Championships winners
Competitors at the 2013 Summer Universiade
21st-century African-American sportspeople
21st-century African-American women
20th-century African-American people
20th-century African-American women
Track and field athletes from Indiana